Tyler Nella (born 8 March 1988) is a Canadian alpine skier.

He competed at the 2010 Winter Olympics in Vancouver in the men's super combined competition.

References

External links
 Tyler Nella at the 2010 Winter Olympics

1988 births
Living people
Alpine skiers at the 2010 Winter Olympics
Canadian male alpine skiers
Olympic alpine skiers of Canada
Sportspeople from Burlington, Ontario